Gustav Ammann (1885–1955) was a Swiss landscape architect who worked in the modernist style.  His former home is now the Gustav-Ammann-Park in Zurich.

Works
Ammann was affiliated with many projects across Switzerland, namely the gardens of the Zurich Airport, the gardens of a public housing site and Friedbad Allenmoos a large park in Oerlikon

References

1885 births
1955 deaths
Swiss landscape architects